Bobbie Friberg da Cruz (born 16 February 1982) is a Swedish former professional footballer who played as a defender.

He has played for IFK Mariehamn in Finland, IFK Norrköping and GAIS in Sweden, Randers in Denmark, and Kongsvinger in Norway. His brother Johan Friberg da Cruz is also a professional football player. Their father is of Cape Verdean origin, and both of the brothers have been invited to the Cape Verde national team.

Club career 
Da Cruz had played for GAIS since he was 16 years old. After being a part of the first team for seven years da Cruz signed a four-year contract with Danish Superliga side Randers FC; he was presented on 22 June 2008 and debuted on 1 March in the derby against AGF. Da Cruz played the full 90 minutes. Randers won the game 2–1. He would go on to make another 11 appearances in the 2008–09 season.

On 29 January 2010, an agreement was reached between Randers and Norwegian club Kongsvinger for da Cruz to go on a one-year loan spell. Both Randers and da Cruz himself felt that he had not lived up to expectations during his first year in Denmark, and that a move to Norwegian football might prove beneficial. Kongsvinger where newcomers to the Norwegian top flight Tippeligaen in 2010, having gained promotion in 2009. On 1 February 2011, da Cruz announced he would move to IFK Norrköping playing in Allsvenskan. He signed a three-year contract with the Swedish top flight club. In 2014, Friberg da Cruz left IFK Norrköping for IFK Mariehamn in the Veikkausliiga. He retired at the end of 2017.

On 8 April 2020, 38-year old Da Cruz came out of retirement to join Swedish Division 4 club FC Nacka Iliria. In the 2021, he played for FC Södrasidan.

Honors
IFK Mariehamn
Veikkausliiga: 2016

References

External links 

 
 
 

1982 births
Living people
Swedish footballers
Association football defenders
GAIS players
Randers FC players
Kongsvinger IL Toppfotball players
IFK Norrköping players
IFK Mariehamn players
Allsvenskan players
Danish Superliga players
Eliteserien players
Veikkausliiga players
Swedish people of Cape Verdean descent
Swedish sportspeople of African descent
Swedish expatriate footballers
Swedish expatriate sportspeople in Denmark
Swedish expatriate sportspeople in Norway
Swedish expatriate sportspeople in Finland
Expatriate men's footballers in Denmark
Expatriate footballers in Norway
Expatriate footballers in Finland
Footballers from Gothenburg